Dewayne Bunch or DeWayne Bunch may refer to:

 Dewayne Bunch (Kentucky politician) (1962–2012), Republican politician and member of the Kentucky state legislature
 Dewayne Bunch (Tennessee politician) (born 1959), Republican politician who served in the Tennessee state legislature

See also
 Bunch (surname)
 Bunch (disambiguation)